Now You See Him, Now You Don't is a 1972 American science fiction comedy film starring Kurt Russell as a chemistry student who accidentally discovers the secret to invisibility. It is the sequel to the 1969 film The Computer Wore Tennis Shoes and was followed by 1975's The Strongest Man in the World.

Now You See Him, Now You Don't was the first Disney film to be shown on television in a two-hour time slot, in 1975. Previous television showings of Disney films had either shown them edited or split into two one-hour time slots.

Plot
At Medfield College, science buff Dexter Riley and his friends, including Richard Schuyler and Debbie Dawson, eavesdrop via a hidden walkie-talkie on a board meeting led by Dean Eugene Higgins, discussing the small college's continuing precarious finances. Later that afternoon, Professor Lufkin shows Higgins around the science laboratory where Dexter is working on an experiment with invisibility and another student, Druffle, explores the flight of bumblebees. That night, during a powerful thunderstorm, the laboratory is struck by lightning, resulting in the destruction of Dexter’s work. The next day, as Dexter examines his burnt equipment with dismay, Higgins meets with A.J. Arno, a recently released prisoner, who had also purchased Medfield's mortgage. When Dexter accidentally drops one half of his glasses into a container of his experimental formula, it appears as if the substance destroys them, but upon closer examination, Dexter realizes the frames are merely partially invisible. After several tests, Dexter places his fingers in the liquid and they disappear. Schuyler and Debbie arrive and are horrified to see Dexter with a partial hand, but Dexter insists Schuyler test the substance as well - admitting only afterward that he does not yet have an antidote and it adheres firmly to all surfaces tested - but just as quickly learn that it is water-soluble and rinses away cleanly.

Just then, Higgins brings Arno to visit the laboratory, stunning the students, as only two years earlier, Dexter was instrumental in exposing Arno's crooked gambling scheme. Dexter and the others notice that Arno is more concerned with the campus architecture than Higgins' speech. Curious about Arno's behavior, Dexter convinces Schuyler to use the invisibility formula to sneak into Arno's office that night. Despite several mishaps, the boys get inside Arno's office where Dexter finds a letter detailing that gambling is legal on the Medfield College lands due to a 1912 statute - and Schuyler finds a model of the college renovated into a gambling town.

The next day Dexter shows the photos and papers to Lufkin and Higgins. Convinced that Druffle's bumblebee study would draw attention and investments to Medfield, Higgins reacts angrily when Dexter assures him that his invisibility formula could win the top prize money in the upcoming Forsythe science contest. Not having admitted to anyone that Medfield has been dropped from the contest for being too insignificant, Higgins  contacts the contest's sponsor, millionaire Timothy Forsythe, and agrees to meet over a game of golf, despite his inability to play. Upon learning of Higgins' plan and suspecting it must be connected with raising money for the college, Dexter urges Schuyler to volunteer to serve as Higgins' caddy while, hidden by the invisibility formula, he will take control of Higgins' golf ball. At the golf club, Forsythe and the state university dean, Collingsgood, are amazed by Higgins' quirky golfing abilities, which include numerous hole-in-one-shots, as is Arno who is also at the club.

After the game, Forsythe agrees to reinstate Medfield into the competition. Meanwhile, Arno accidentally sees Dexter becoming visible in the club showers and grows suspicious. When the local television news covers Higgins' extraordinary golf game, he is invited to join an exclusive tournament in nearby Ocean City. Convinced that he will win enough money to pay the college's mortgage, Higgins brashly accepts and that afternoon departs with Schuyler. Learning of the tournament too late, Dexter misses the plane and is forced to watch the competition on television where Higgins' game against two professionals is a disaster. Arno and his henchmen also watch the tournament and ponder Higgins' odd inconsistency. Upon returning to the college, Higgins tells Lufkin that Druffle's bumblebee experiment is the school's last chance. Both men are stunned when Druffle appears swathed in bandages after being attacked by the bumblebees, to which he is allergic. Hoping to assuage the crestfallen Higgins, Lufkin suggests that they give Dexter's unproven formula a chance and the dean reluctantly agrees.

That evening, Arno’s henchman Cookie, disguised as a janitor, sneaks into the campus laboratory where he witnesses Dexter and Schuyler using the invisibility spray and reports to Arno, who orders him to return and steal it. The following day, Forsythe and members of his committee arrive on campus to judge the best science experiment at the college. Unaware that their spray bottle has been replaced by Cookie, Dexter and Schuyler make their presentation and are stunned when it has no effect. Forsythe and Higgins depart as Dexter remains confused until he chats with Charlie the janitor. Learning that there is no night janitor, Dexter realizes that Cookie likely stole the formula. Concluding that Arno must be behind the theft, Dexter plants a walkie-talkie in his office.

A couple of days later, Schuyler overhears Arno plotting with Cookie to rob the Medfield Bank by making themselves and the money invisible. Certain that if he could retrieve the formula before the Forsythe Award announcement that night he could still win the contest, Dexter sends Schuyler to the police and goes to inform the bank's president, Wilfred Sampson. When both the police and Sampson dismiss the boys' story about invisibility, Dexter and his friends gather outside of the bank. When an invisible Arno and Cookie knock out the guards and take the money, Dexter unsuccessfully tries to use a fire hydrant to hose the men down as they exit the bank. Sampson contacts the police, who join the college students in a wild chase of the car driven by the invisible robbers.

After a long police chase, Dexter forces Arno's car into a swimming pool where it, the money, and the men become visible. Arno and his henchmen are arrested. Dexter and the others dash to the presentation of the Forsythe Award and plead for one more opportunity to demonstrate their invention. Frustrated by Dexter's determination, Higgins intervenes just as Dexter sprays Schuyler, and, again, there is no result. Realizing the dip in the pool has diluted the formula, Dexter tries to explain to Forsythe. Just when Higgins tells everyone for the last time that invisibility does not exist, the top half of him becomes invisible, thus shocking the group and winning the top prize to save Medfield for another year.

Cast

 Kurt Russell as Dexter Riley
 Cesar Romero as A.J. Arno
 Joe Flynn as Dean Eugene (E.J.) Higgins
 Jim Backus as Timothy Forsythe
 William Windom as Professor Lufkin
 Michael McGreevey as Richard Schuyler
 Ed Begley Jr. as Druffle
 Richard Bakalyan as Cookie
 Joyce Menges as Debbie Dawson
 Alan Hewitt as Dean Edgar Collingswood
 Kelly Thordsen as Police Sergeant Cassidy
 Bing Russell as Alfred
 Edward Andrews as Mr. Sampson, the Bank President
 George O'Hanlon as Ted, Bank Guard
 John Myhers as Golfer
 Pat Delany as Winifred Keesely, Higgins' Secretary
 Robert Rothwell as Driver
 Frank Welker as Henry Farthington
 Mike Evans as Myles

Production notes

Locations 
The Medfield College exteriors were on the Disney lot: the main Medfield College building and courtyard used in the title sequence was the old Animation Building at the corner of Mickey Avenue and Dopey Drive. Parts of the chase scenes were done along  the main street that goes through the area of the golf courses in Griffith Park.

Props 
The green Volkswagen Beetle used by Schuyler was two Herbie cars from The Love Bug: one was the vehicle carried by Tang Wu's Chinese Camp students (this was a gutted car and a rubber truck tire tube was placed under the passenger door, and when inflated suddenly, it would tip the car over, this car used in the scene where A.J. Arno rams it). The other car was used in the scenes with Schuyler driving it on a flat tire (the Art Dept. painted the car green and dusted it to give a look of neglect; when the sunroof is open, the original Herbie pearl white paint job under the tarp sunroof can be seen where the green was not painted).

Comics adaptations
A text piece with illustrations adapting the film appeared in Walt Disney Comics Digest #37 (Oct. 1972) with a production still on the cover. The Walt Disney's Treasury of Classic Tales comic strip ran an adaptation written by Frank Reilly and drawn by John Uslher that appeared between April 2 and June 25, 1972.

Reception
The movie received a mixed reception. A negative review came from The New York Times, which accorded: "Now with all due respect to children's intuition and judgment, may we suggest that they now try the Real McCoy, if they haven't already. How about the original "The Invisible Man" on television? There's grand, serious fun, kids. Plus—square or not—something to think about". A positive review came from Arthur D. Murphy of Variety, who stated that "virtually all the key creative elements which early in 1970 made The Computer Wore Tennis Shoes a successful... Walt Disney feature have encored superbly in Now You See Him, Now You Don't". Gene Siskel of the Chicago Tribune gave the film three stars out of four and called it "one of the more clever entertainments for children designed by Disney Studios". Charles Champlin of the Los Angeles Times called it "a modest program picture with a notably professional cast and offering special effects which are workmanlike rather than inspired".

See also
 Dexter Riley
 List of American films of 1972

References

External links
 
 
 
 
 

1972 films
1970s science fiction comedy films
American science fiction comedy films
American sequel films
1970s English-language films
Films directed by Robert Butler
Films produced by Ron W. Miller
Films about invisibility
Medfield College films
Walt Disney Pictures films
Films based on The Invisible Man
1972 comedy films
1970s American films